Khongodory (Khongoodor) is a rural locality (an ulus) in Tunkinsky District, Republic of Buryatia, Russia. The population was 75 as of 2010. There is 1 street.

References 

Rural localities in Tunkinsky District